Jorge Mosera Sipaco (born 28 May 2002) is an Equatorial Guinean footballer who plays as a defender for Cano Sport Academy and the Equatorial Guinea national team.

Club career
Mosera moved from Real X Balompié to Cano Sport in January 2019.

International career
Mosera made his international debut for Equatorial Guinea on 28 July 2019.

References

2002 births
Living people
Association football defenders
Equatoguinean footballers
Equatorial Guinea international footballers
Equatorial Guinea youth international footballers
Cano Sport Academy players
Bubi people